There are several sectors in Ethiopia where businesses are particularly vulnerable to corruption. Land distribution and administration is a sector where corruption is institutionalized, and facilitation payments as well as bribes are often demanded from businesses when they deal with land-related issues.

Corruption also occurs when businesses obtain permits and licenses due to complicated bureaucracy. Public procurement is also seriously hampered by corruption, and different types of irregularities exist, such as non-transparent tender processes and awarding contracts to people with close connection to the government and ruling party.

On Transparency International's 2022 Corruption Perceptions Index, Ethiopia scored 38 on a scale from 0 ("highly corrupt") to 100 ("very clean"). When ranked by score, Ethiopia ranked 94th among the 180 countries in the Index, where the country ranked first is perceived to have the most honest public sector.  For comparison, the best score was 90 (ranked 1), and the worst score was 12 (ranked 180).

References

External links
Ethiopia Corruption Profile from the Business Anti-Corruption Portal
The Problem of Corruption in Ethiopia

Ethiopia
Politics of Ethiopia
Society of Ethiopia
Crime in Ethiopia by type
Economy of Ethiopia